The Lindenwood Lady Lions women represented Lindenwood University in CHA women's ice hockey during the 2015-16 NCAA Division I women's ice hockey season. The Lady Lions finished conference play in fifth place, and were eliminated in the first round of the CHA Tournament Final by Robert Morris.

Offseason

May 19: Nicole Hensley attended the Team USA Goaltending Development Camp.

Recruiting

Roster

2015–16 Lady Lions

Schedule

|-
!colspan=12 style=" "| Regular Season

|-
!colspan=12 style=" "|CHA Tournament

Awards and honors

Nicole Hensley G, 2015-16 All-CHA First Team 

Sharra Jasper F, 2015-16 All-CHA First Team 

Shannon Morris-Reade F, 2015-16 All-CHA Rookie Team

References

Lindenwood
Lindenwood Lions women's ice hockey seasons
Lindenwood
Lindenwood